Viação Aérea São Paulo S/A (São Paulo Airways), better known as  VASP, was an airline with its head office in the VASP Building on the grounds of São Paulo–Congonhas Airport in São Paulo, Brazil. It had main bases at São Paulo's two major airports, São Paulo–Congonhas Airport (CGH) and São Paulo/Guarulhos International Airport (GRU).

History

The airline was established on 4 November 1933 by the state government of São Paulo and started operations on 12 November 1933. VASP was the first airline to serve the interior of the state of São Paulo (São Paulo-São Carlos-São José do Rio Preto and São Paulo-Ribeirão Preto-Uberaba), with two Monospar ST-4. At the start of the 1930s, it was the only carrier to operate with land planes in their service area. At the time this was a real exploit due to the lack of adequate non-coastal airports. Many landing strips were improvised in flat pastures. This insistence on using only land planes led to the building in 1936 of one of the country's most important airports, Congonhas, located in the city of São Paulo, far from the coast. During its early years, Congonhas Airport was popularly known as Campo da VASP ("VASP's airfield").

In 1939, VASP bought Aerolloyd Iguassu, which included also a license to operate flights to the states of Paraná and Santa Catarina. In 1962, VASP became a national airline when it  acquired Lóide Aéreo Nacional, and with it its license to operate nationwide.

On 6 July 1959, VASP, Cruzeiro do Sul and Varig initiated the air shuttle services between Rio de Janeiro-Santos Dumont and São Paulo-Congonhas airports, the first of its kind in the world. The three companies coordinated their schedules, operations, and shared revenue. The service was a direct response to the competition imposed by Real Transportes Aéreos. The idea, baptized as Air bridge ( in Portuguese), inspired on the Berlin Airlift was so successful that it was abandoned only in 1999. Flights operated on an hourly basis initially by Convair 240 (Varig), Convair 340 (Cruzeiro) and Saab 90 Scandia (VASP). In a matter of a few months the shuttle service led by Varig won the battle against Real, which was anyway bought by Varig in 1961. Sadia Transportes Aéreos joined the service in 1968. Between 1975 and 1992 it was operated exclusively by Varig's Lockheed L-188 Electra which for sometime and for the sake of neutrality did not have the name Varig on the fuselage.

Although it had been remarkably well-run for most of its life as a state-owned company, by the 1980s VASP was being plagued by inefficiency, losses covered by state capital injections, and a bloated payroll for political reasons. Under the Brazilian government's neoliberal policies newly introduced at the time, VASP was privatized in 1990. A majority stake was bought by the VOE/Canhedo Group, a company formed by the Canhedo Group of Brasília and VASP employees.

Under the command of its new owner and president, Wagner Canhedo, VASP quickly expanded operations in the country, and created international routes. Until VASP's entry into the international market, Varig had, for all intents and purposes, been Brazil's sole international airline since 1965. However, after many years of mismanagement, financial losses, soaring debt and bad credit, in 2002 it cancelled all of its international operations to concentrate in the domestic market. By that time, VASP had plummeted from the second to the fourth position in the Brazilian airline market, flying an aging fleet of Boeing 737s (most of them of the obsolete −200 series) and Airbus A300s.

The company faced its worst crisis in 2004 as new airlines such rise in the country, which led to the suspension of service to many Brazilian cities and the cancellation of flights. As a result, the airline had its domestic market share reduced to 10%. On 27 January 2005, Brazil's then civil aviation regulator, DAC, grounded the airline from operating scheduled services pending a financial investigation. VASP was allowed to operate charter services until April 2005, giving it a chance to prove its financial stability in order to retain its air operator certificate.

By December 2007, the once-proud company had stopped flying altogether, and was reduced to providing maintenance services to other airlines. Even during the worst of VASP's troubles, its maintenance expertise and personnel had always been held in high regard. It had been operating under the new Brazilian bankruptcy law since July 2006, and had its recovery plan approved on 27 August 2006. However, in 2008 it declared bankruptcy.

As of October 2020, nine of the company's planes (seven Boeing 737-200s and two Airbus A300s) are still grounded at Congonhas-São Paulo Airport since 2005 and by now badly weathered and dilapidated, began to be dismantled and sold for scrap at auction. Each plane in its current condition was estimated to be worth only 30,000 to 50,000 real (approximately $20,000 to 33,000 US dollars), considerably less than even its monthly parking and storage fees. The company's fleet of 27 planes had been also grounded in similar circumstances since 2005 at various Brazilian airports.

Services

Services at time of closure
VASP operated services to the following domestic scheduled destinations (as of January 2005): Aracaju, Belém, Brasília, Curitiba, Fortaleza, Foz do Iguaçu, Maceió, Manaus, Natal, Recife, Rio de Janeiro–Galeão, Rio de Janeiro–Santos Dumont, Salvador, São Luís, São Paulo–Congonhas, São Paulo–Guarulhos, Teresina and Porto Alegre.

Services ended before closure
VASP once had a much more extensive network, which covered virtually every major Brazilian city with an airport and in the 1990s included such international destinations as: Buenos Aires–Ezeiza, Quito, Miami, New York–JFK, Los Angeles, San Francisco, Toronto–Pearson, Seoul–Gimpo, Casablanca, Barcelona, Lisbon, Brussels, Osaka–Kansai, Athens, Frankfurt and Zürich.

Fleet

Fleet history
Over the years, the fleet of VASP consisted of the following aircraft:

Fleet in 1970

VASPEX

VASPEX was the company's subsidiary for immediate dispatch of correspondence, documents and objects. It filed for bankruptcy, but ended up going bankrupt with VASP on September 4, 2008. It operated the Boeing 727 and 737-200 for almost all of Brazil. It was created to operate together with VASP delivering orders of the type.

VASPEX fleet

Curiosities
The 3rd ex VASP B737, the first operator of the legendary Boeing model in Brazil, is today at Auto Shopping Só Marcas, in the city of Contagem, almost on the border with Belo Horizonte. With the old license plate PP-SMC, this B737-200 was manufactured in 1969 and flew exclusively on the former VASP, until the company closed, staying at Congonhas Airport for several years, until it was auctioned and bought by the owner of the shopping center and other enterprises. This plane has been the scene of several events and was even used during a political propaganda by the Workers' Party - PT in 2022. It was also in evidence because of a girl who filled it with World Cup stickers. Despite the political and football art, and now graffiti, the plane itself was not painted, but gained a cover around it, which receives the art related to the events that take place on the top floor of the used car shopping centre. The last so-called artistic intervention was by Red Room, a production company that is taking German DJ Emanuel Satie, who plays Melodic House & Techno, to the capital of Minas Gerais, as well as Brazilian DJ Jessica Brankka, who recently broke through with the track Too Many Roads. The B737 is the backdrop for a sunset event starting at 6 pm on Saturday, March 18, 2023. The idea is for the jet to make a composition with the DJs who will play until 6 am.

Accidents and incidents

Accidents
 8 November 1940: a Junkers Ju 52/3mg3e registration PP-SPF taking-off from Rio de Janeiro-Santos Dumont to São Paulo-Congonhas collided on mid-air with the de Havilland Dragonfly registration LV-KAB belonging to the Anglo Mexican Petroleum Company (Shell-Mex), which was preparing for a water-land in front of Fluminense Yacht Club, today Rio de Janeiro Yacht Club in Botafogo. Both aircraft crashed killing all 14 passengers and 4 crew on the VASP aircraft and the pilot of the Shell-Mex aircraft.
 27 August 1943: a Junkers Ju 52/3mg3e registration PP-SPD flying from São Paulo-Congonhas to Rio de Janeiro-Santos Dumont struck a building of the Naval Academy located close to the airport shortly after the second attempt to land at Rio under fog. The aircraft broke in two and one part fell in the water. Of the 21 passengers and crew, three survived.
 13 December 1950: a Douglas C-47A registration PP-SPT while on initial climb from Londrina lost engine power, crashed and caught fire. There were 3 ground fatalities.
 18 May 1951: a Douglas C-47B registration PP-SPL en route from Santa Cruz do Rio Pardo to Presidente Prudente hit high ground while flying in bad weather. All 6 passengers and crew died.
 8 September 1951: a Douglas C-47B registration PP-SPQ struck a house after take-off from São Paulo-Congonhas and crashed. Thirteen passengers and crew and three persons on the ground died.
 13 May 1952: a Douglas C-47B registration PP-SPM operating a flight from São Paulo-Congonhas to Bauru lost control when carrying out an emergency landing following an engine failure. Two crew members and 3 passengers died.
 30 December 1958: a Saab Scandia 90A registration PP-SQE flying from Rio de Janeiro-Santos Dumont to São Paulo-Congonhas during climb after take-off had a failure on engine no. 1. The pilot initiated procedures to return to the airport but during the second turn the aircraft stalled and crashed into Guanabara Bay. Of the 34 passengers and crew aboard, 20 died.
 23 September 1959: a Saab Scandia 90A registration PP-SQV en route from São Paulo-Congonhas to Rio de Janeiro-Santos Dumont during climb after take-off did not gain enough height and crashed  minutes out of São Paulo, killing all 20 passengers and crew.
 22 December 1959: a Vickers Viscount 800 registration PP-SRG while on approach to land at Rio de Janeiro-Galeão was involved in a mid-air collision with the Brazilian Air Force Fokker S-11 (T-21) serial number FAB0742 in the vicinity of Manguinhos Airport. All 32 people on board the Viscount were killed, as were a further ten on the ground. The T-21 pilot parachuted to safety. This accident eventually led to the closure of Manguinhos Airport
 26 November 1962: a Saab Scandia 90A registration PP-SRA en route from São Paulo-Congonhas to Rio de Janeiro-Santos Dumont collided in the air over the Municipality of Paraibuna, State of São Paulo with a private Cessna 310 registration PT-BRQ en route from Rio de Janeiro-Santos Dumont to São Paulo-Campo de Marte. Both were flying on the same airway AB-6 in opposite directions and failed to have visual contact. The aircraft crashed, killing all 23 passengers and crew of the Saab and four occupants of the Cessna.
 4 September 1964: a Vickers Viscount 701C registration PP-SRR operating flight 141 from Vitória to Rio de Janeiro-Santos Dumont collided with a mountain over the location of Nova Friburgo while flying away from the intended track. All 39 passengers and crew died.
 3 March 1965: a Vickers Viscount registration PP-SRQ was damaged beyond economic repair at Rio de Janeiro-Galeão International Airport when the aircraft departed the runway during a simulated engine failure on take-off.
 31 October 1966: a Vickers Viscount registration PP-SRM was damaged beyond economic repair when it overran the runway at Rio de Janeiro Santos Dumont Airport
 15 September 1968: a Vickers Viscount registration PP-SRE crashed at São Paulo while on a crew training flight. One of the two crew was killed.
 11 January 1969: a Douglas C-47A PP-SPR was damaged beyond economic repair at Loanda, Paraná.
 14 September 1969: a Douglas C-47B registration PP-SPP operating flight 555 took off from Londrina to São Paulo-Congonhas but due to a feathered propeller, had to return to the origin. While on approach for landing, the aircraft made a sharp left turn and crashed. All 20 passengers and crew died.
 12 April 1972: a NAMC YS-11A registration PP-SMI flying from São Paulo-Congonhas to Rio de Janeiro-Santos Dumont flew into the side of a mountain while on descent 50 km north of Rio de Janeiro due to pilot mistake. All 25 passengers and crew died.
 29 January 1973: a Douglas C-47 PP-SQA crashed on landing at Rondonópolis Airport.
 15 May 1973: a Vickers Viscount PP-SRD was damaged beyond economic repair when it departed the runway on landing at Salvador Airport and the undercarriage collapsed.
 23 October 1973: a NAMC YS-11A registration PP-SMJ flying from Rio de Janeiro-Santos Dumont to Belo Horizonte-Pampulha during an aborted take-off overrun the runway and slid into Guanabara Bay. Of the 65 passengers and crew, 8 passengers died.
 27 February 1975: an Embraer EMB 110 Bandeirante registration PP-SBE operating a flight 640 from São Paulo-Congonhas to Bauru and Araçatuba crashed after take-off from Congonhas. All 2 crew members and 13 passengers died.
 25 May 1982: a Boeing 737-200 registration PP-SMY on landing procedures at Brasília during rain, made a hard landing with nose gear first. The gear collapsed and the aircraft skidded off the runway breaking in two. Two passengers out of 118 occupants died.
 8 June 1982: a Boeing 727-200 registration PP-SRK operating flight 168 from Rio de Janeiro-Galeão to Fortaleza collided with a mountain while on approach to Fortaleza. The captain descended below a minimum descent altitude. All 137 passengers and crew died.
 28 January 1986: VASP Flight 210 flying from São Paulo-Guarulhos to Belo Horizonte unknowingly tried to take-off from Guarulhos under foggy conditions from a taxiway. The take-off was aborted, but the aircraft overran, collided with a dyke and broke in two. One passenger died.
 22 June 1992: a cargo Boeing 737-200C registration PP-SND en route from Rio Branco to Cruzeiro do Sul crashed in the jungle while on arrival procedures to Cruzeiro do Sul. The crew of 2 and 1 occupant died.

Incidents
 25 April 1970: a Boeing 737-2A1 en route from Brasília to Manaus-Ponta Pelada was hijacked by a person who demanded to be flown to Cuba. The hijack lasted a day.
 14 May 1970: a Boeing 737-2A1 en route from Brasília to Manaus-Ponta Pelada was hijacked by a person who demanded to be flown to Cuba. The hijack lasted a day.
 22 February 1975: a Boeing 737-2A1 registration PP-SMU en route from Goiânia to Brasília was hijacked by 1 person who demanded ransom. The hijacker was taken down.
 29 September 1988: a Boeing 737-300 registration PP-SNT operating flight 375 en route from Porto Velho to Rio de Janeiro via Brasília, Goiânia and Belo Horizonte-Confins was hijacked by 1 person on the final leg of the flight. The hijacker wanted to force a crash on the Palácio do Planalto, the official presidential workplace in Brasília. The pilot convinced the hijacker to divert to Goiânia where an emergency landing was made. The hijack ended with 1 victim.
 18 August 2000: a Boeing 737-2A1 registration PP-SMG en route from Foz do Iguaçu to Curitiba-Afonso Pena and on to Rio de Janeiro-Galeão, Brasília, and São Luís, was hijacked by 5 persons with the purpose of robbing BRL 5 million (approximately US$2.75 million) that the aircraft was transporting. The pilot was forced to land at Porecatu where the hijackers fled with the money. There were no victims.

See also
List of defunct airlines of Brazil

References

External links

 VASP accidents as per Aviation Safety Network
 Archive of VASP pages  (1998–2000)
 Archive of VASP pages 
 VASPEX (Archive) 

 
Defunct airlines of Brazil
Airlines established in 1933
Airlines disestablished in 2005